Philip Michael Hensher FRSL (born 20 February 1965) is an English novelist, critic and journalist.

Biography
Son of Raymond J. and Miriam Hensher, his father a bank manager and composer and his mother a university librarian, Hensher was born in South London,, although he spent the majority of his childhood and adolescence in Sheffield, attending Tapton School. He did his undergraduate degree at Lady Margaret Hall, Oxford, before attending Jesus College, Cambridge, where he was awarded a PhD in 1992 for work on 18th-century painting and satire.

Early in his career he worked as a clerk in the House of Commons, from which he was fired over the content of an interview he gave to a gay magazine. He has published a number of novels, and is a regular contributor, columnist and book reviewer for newspapers and weeklies such as The Guardian, The Spectator, The Mail on Sunday and The Independent.

The Bedroom of the Mister's Wife (1999) brings together 14 of his short stories, including "Dead Languages", which A. S. Byatt selected for her Oxford Book of English Short Stories (1998), making Hensher the youngest author included in the anthology.

He is Professor of Creative Writing at Bath Spa University, formerly Bath College of Higher Education. From 2005 to 2012 he taught creative writing at the University of Exeter.  He has edited new editions of numerous classic works of English literature, including novels by Charles Dickens and Nancy Mitford. Hensher has also served as a judge for the Booker Prize.

Since 2000 Philip Hensher has been listed as one of the 100 most influential LGBT people in Britain, and in 2003 he was selected as one of Granta's twenty Best of Young British Novelists.

In 2002 his novel The Mulberry Empire was longlisted for the Man Booker Prize. In 2008 Hensher's semi-autobiographical novel The Northern Clemency was shortlisted for the prize. In 2012 he won first prize in the German Travel Writers Award and was shortlisted for the Green Carnation Prize. He also won the Stonewall Prize for the Journalist of the Year in 2007 and the Somerset Maugham Award for his novel  Kitchen Venom in 1996.

In 2013 his novel Scenes from Early Life was shortlisted for the Green Carnation Prize, and awarded the Ondaatje Prize. It is based on his husband's childhood against the backdrop of the war of independence in Bangladesh.

Hensher wrote the libretto for Thomas Adès's opera Powder Her Face (1995) and in 2015 he edited The Penguin Book of the British Short Story.

Hensher's early works of fiction been characterized as having an "ironic, knowing distance from their characters" and "icily precise skewerings of pretension and hypocrisy". His historical novel The Mulberry Empire "echoes with the rhythm and language of folk tales" while "play[ing] games" with narrative forms.

Hensher served on the jury for the 2018 Scotiabank Giller Prize.

Hensher is married to Zaved Mahmood, a human rights lawyer at the United Nations.

Works
Among Hensher's novels are:
 Other Lulus (1994)
 Kitchen Venom (1996)
 Pleasured (1998)
 The Mulberry Empire (2002), Flamingo/HarperPerennial. Longlisted for the Man Booker Prize. 
 The Fit (2004) 4th Estate/HarperPerennial
 The Northern Clemency (2008), HarperCollins/4th Estate. Shortlisted for the Man Booker Prize.
 King of the Badgers (31 March 2011), 4th Estate, 
 Scenes from Early Life (12 April 2012), 4th Estate, . Winner of the Royal Society of Literature's Ondaatje Prize (2013)
 The Emperor Waltz (3 July 2014), 4th Estate
 The Friendly Ones (8 February 2018), 4th Estate
 A Small Revolution in Germany (6 February 2020), 4th Estate

He has also published two short story collections:
 The Bedroom of the Mister's Wife (1999)
 Tales of Persuasion (2016), 4th Estate, 

Belles lettres:
 The Missing Ink: The Lost Art of Handwriting (2012)
 (edited) The Penguin Book of the British Short Story (2015)
 (edited) The Penguin Book of the Contemporary British Short Story (2018)

References

External links
Hensher's staff pages at Bath Spa University
Hensher's staff pages at the University of Exeter
Mostly Fiction interview with Philip Hensher, author of The Northern Clemency

Living people
1965 births
English gay writers
20th-century English novelists
21st-century English novelists
English short story writers
People educated at Tapton School
Alumni of Lady Margaret Hall, Oxford
Alumni of Jesus College, Cambridge
Academics of Bath Spa University
Academics of the University of Exeter
Fellows of the Royal Society of Literature
English male short story writers
English male novelists
20th-century British short story writers
21st-century British short story writers
20th-century English male writers
21st-century English male writers
English LGBT novelists